Franklin Hood  (October 5, 1908 – August 21, 1955) was an American football halfback  who played one season in the National Football League with the Pittsburgh Pirates. He played college football at the University of Pittsburgh and attended Bellefonte Academy in Bellefonte, Pennsylvania.

References

External links
Just Sports Stats

1908 births
1955 deaths
Players of American football from Pennsylvania
American football halfbacks
Pittsburgh Panthers football players
Pittsburgh Pirates (football) players
People from Centre County, Pennsylvania